This article is about the particular significance of the year 1998 to Wales and its people.

Incumbents
Secretary of State for Wales
Ron Davies (until 27 October)
Alun Michael
Archbishop of Wales – Alwyn Rice Jones, Bishop of St Asaph
Archdruid of the National Eisteddfod of Wales – Dafydd Rowlands

Events
24 February - The Criminal Cases Review Commission overturns the murder charge of Mahmood Hussein Mattan, who was executed in 1952 for killing a Cardiff shopkeeper.
February - Britain's first official register of historic landscapes is published by Cadw. It lists 36 landscapes in Wales of outstanding historic interest.
6 March - Flintshire Bridge is officially opened.
8-9 April - Torrential rain over eastern Wales results in widespread flooding.
13 April - Montgomeryshire MP Lembit Öpik is seriously injured in a paragliding accident in his constituency.
May - Cistercian Way long-distance trail originates.
June - The Arts Council of Wales publishes its consultation paper Building A Creative Society.
31 July - The Government of Wales Act 1998, that will establish a devolved Welsh Assembly, receives its Royal Assent.
August - Ron Davies is appointed to the highest order of the Gorsedd of the Bards at the 1998 National Eisteddfod in Bridgend.
19 September - Ron Davies is elected in preference to Rhodri Morgan as Labour's candidate for First Secretary of the Assembly.
22-31 October - Heavy rainfall across Wales results in river levels rising to warning levels. Flood plains are inundated and there is extensive flooding of houses and other property.
27 October - Ron Davies resigns as Secretary of State for Wales after being mugged in an incident on Clapham Common, following what he described as an "error of judgment".
18 November - Jon Owen Jones, MP, Parliamentary Under Secretary of State for Wales, announces that the Environment Agency has been asked for a report on the October floods.
November - Maenofferen slate quarry at Blaenau Ffestiniog ceases production.

Arts and literature
Bryn Terfel gives a recital at Carnegie Hall.

Awards
Glyndŵr Award - Iwan Bala
National Eisteddfod of Wales (held in Bridgend)
National Eisteddfod of Wales: Chair - withheld
National Eisteddfod of Wales: Crown - Emyr Lewis, "Rhyddid"
National Eisteddfod of Wales: Prose Medal - Eurig Wyn, Blodyn Tatws
Wales Book of the Year: 
English language: Mike Jenkins - Wanting to Belong
Welsh language: Iwan Llwyd - Dan Ddylanwad
Gwobr Goffa Daniel Owen - Geraint V. Jones, Semtecs

New books

English language
Gillian Clarke - Five Fields
James Hawes - Rancid Aluminium
Rhys Hughes - Rawhead & Bloody Bones
Mario Risoli - When Pele Broke our Hearts: Wales and the 1958 World Cup
Sarah Waters - Tipping the Velvet

Welsh language
Dafydd Huws - Dyddiadur Dyn Dŵad
Huw Ethall - Pennar Davies: Y Dyn a'i Waith

Film
Anthony Hopkins and Catherine Zeta-Jones star in The Mask of Zorro.

Welsh language films
Bride of War, starring Huw Garmon (in Welsh, English, French, German and Polish).

Music
Indie music band Terris are formed in Newport. 
Anweledig - Sombreros yn y Glaw
Charlotte Church - Voice of an Angel
Melys - Rumours and Curses
Bonnie Tyler - All in One Voice

Broadcasting

Welsh-language television
November – A new digital channel is launched, broadcasting in Welsh for twelve hours a day.

English-language television

Sport

BBC Wales Sports Personality of the Year – Iwan Thomas
Commonwealth Games – September
Kelly Morgan wins the badminton women's singles;
Iwan Thomas wins the men's 400 metres;
Desmond Davies wins the men's individual skeet shooting;
Wales win a total of 15 medals, including the three golds.
Snooker
8 February – Mark Williams wins his first Masters title.

Births
 12 March – Will Jones, rugby player
 5 June – Dafydd Jones, footballer
 18 December – Cameron Coxe, footballer
 25 December – Will Griffiths, rugby player
 29 December – Mark Harris, footballer

Deaths
3 January – Tony Duncan, golfer and cricketer, 83
18 February – Robbie James, footballer, 40 (collapsed and died during match)
1 April – Mary Wynne Warner, mathematician, 65
2 April – Dai Davies, trade unionist, 88
4 April – Käte Bosse-Griffiths, author, 87
14 April – Dorothy Squires, singer, 83
11 May – Vronwy Hankey (née Fisher), archaeologist, 81
13 May – Arthur Rees, Wales international rugby player and police Chief Constable, 85
17 May – Hugh Cudlipp, journalist, 84
5 July – James Eirian Davies, minister and poet, 80
23 July – R. Tudur Jones, theologian and politician, 77
28 July – Nancy Evans, table tennis player, 95
3 August (in Waipukurau, New Zealand) – Ronnie Boon, Wales rugby union player, 89
12 September – Horace Charles Jones, poet, 92
5 October – Megs Jenkins, actress, 81
31 October – Eddie Perry, footballer, 89
16 December – Kenyon Jones, rugby player, 87
16 December – Tommy Davies, boxer, 78
31 December – Alan Morris, footballer, 44

See also
1998 in Northern Ireland

References

 
Wales